1963 Speedway World Team Cup was the fourth edition of the FIM Speedway World Team Cup to determine the team world champions. 

The final took place in Vienna, Austria. The World Champion title was won by Sweden (37 pts) who beat Czechoslovakia (27 pts), Great Britain (25 pts) and Poland (7 pts).

Format

Qualification

Nordic Round
 23 May
  Målilla, Målilla Speedway

British Round
The British Round was cancelled. Great Britain was seeded to the Final.

Central European Round
 13 June
  Olching, Olching Speedwaybahn

East European Round
 4 August
  Ufa

World final
 31 August
  Vienna, Stadion Wien

See also
 1963 Individual Speedway World Championship
 motorcycle speedway

References

1963
World Team
August 1963 sports events in Europe